"You're My Favorite Star" is a song recorded by American country music duo The Bellamy Brothers and written by David Bellamy, one-half of the duo. It was released in October 1981 via Warner Bros. Records and Curb Records, reaching number seven on the Hot Country Songs charts. The single and the one before it, "They Could Put Me in Jail", were never included on a studio album, although this song was later added to the duo's third Greatest Hits album in 1989.

Regarding the song, David said that it was "the first one we'd done with steel drums and a reggae feel." He said that this song led the duo to record other reggae-styled songs on later albums, such as "Get into Reggae Cowboy".

Chart performance

References

1981 singles
The Bellamy Brothers songs
Warner Records singles
Curb Records singles
Songs written by David Bellamy (singer)
1981 songs